"Let's Love" is a song recorded by South Korean singer Suho. It was released on March 30, 2020 by SM Entertainment as the lead single of his debut extended play, Self-Portrait (2020).

Composition 
"Let's Love" was described as a modern rock song with a warm atmosphere. The lyrics convey a message about mustering the courage to express love, even if you feel clumsy or inadequate.

Commercial performance 
Upon release, "Let's Love" topped the real-time charts of various major Korean music platforms. The track debuted at number seven on the Gaon Digital Chart for the chart ending April 4, 2020.

Charts

Accolades

Release history

References 

2020 songs
2020 singles
Korean-language songs
SM Entertainment singles